The AN-94 (Russian: 5,45-мм автомат Никонова обр. 1987 г. / АН-94 «Абака́н», GRAU designation 6P33) is a Russian assault rifle. The initials stand for Avtomat Nikonova model of 1994, after its chief designer Gennadiy Nikonov, who previously worked on the Nikonov machine gun.

The AN-94 was designed as a potential replacement to the AK-74 series of rifles currently in service with the Russian Armed Forces. Due to its complex design and expense, it failed to fill its intended role as a replacement for the AK-74, but it is in limited use as a special purpose weapon.

The AN-94 has the unique feature of delaying felt recoil for the first two rounds. This, it is claimed, increases hit probability under the most adverse combat conditions. The AN-94 offers a unique two-shot burst function at a stated 1800 rounds per minute.

Design and operation

The most conspicuous identifying feature of the AN-94 is its magazine which is canted several degrees to the right of center (when viewed from a firing position). This design feature is necessary to accommodate the unique ammunition feed mechanism. The AN-94 is chambered in the same 5.45×39mm M74 cartridge as the AK-74, and it utilizes a rotating bolt to lock the action. Gennadiy Nikonov and his engineers used the Russian term смещенный импульс свободного затвора (Smeŝennyj Impulʹs Svobodnogo Zatvora) to describe the rifle's method of operation, meaning "recoil shifted pulse."

When a round is fired, residual energy from the propellant charge in the cartridge acts upon the safely locked breech and bolt carrier. Simultaneously, a quantity of powder gases driving the bullet through the barrel is tapped and acts upon the piston in the gas tube located above and parallel to the barrel. The movement of the piston and its connecting rod acts upon the locking bolt, causing it to rotate and allow the breech to safely open. This initiates the extraction and ejection cycle for the first spent cartridge. After the first round has been fired, the bolt and carrier group move toward the rear, ejecting the first casing towards the front of the ejection window. The movement of the Carrier is directly connected to a pulley system which is connected to a small metal rod on the rear side of the magazine well. The rod pushes a second round into the firing position. Once this action has completed the bolt and carrier group will stop and move back towards the front of the gun before it has hit the rear of the receiver. When the bolt has fully locked it will fire the second round. This whole process happens very quickly and it is how the 2 round burst works. For any follow-up rounds, the hammer - in fact a horizontal striker, as opposed to the rotating hammer of the AK rifle - is held until every full recoil cycle is finished, to prevent the rifle firing at the extremely high rate continuously. This means that after every bullet the bolt and carrier group will travel the whole distance of possible travel, resulting in a more manageable rate of 600 RPM.

Users

: Used in limited numbers by the Russian Army, Police, Federal Security Service and Ministry of Internal Affairs.
  Provisional Irish Republican Army: The IRA allegedly imported 20 examples in late 2001.

See also
AKM
AK-74
AO-63, competitor to the AN-94
AEK-971
AK-101
AK-107
AK-12
List of Russian weaponry
List of assault rifles
Heckler & Koch G11

References

Further reading
 Михаил Дегтярев, "Ан-94 «Абакан» – это просто",  Калашников. Оружие, Боеприпасы, Снаряжение, 2007/5, pp. 6–12 (detailed explanation of the mechanism)
 Nowa Technika Wojskowa 2002-03/04. (detailed history of the development of Nikonov's gun)

External links

 Rocket Surgery: Inside the Russian Nikonov AN94
AN 94 operating mechanism of two round burst video YouTube
Izhmash – official page
Modern Firearms
"Nikonov AN-94" Shooting Illustrated, March 24, 2011

5.45×39mm assault rifles
Weapons and ammunition introduced in 1994
Assault rifles of Russia
Izhevsk machine-building plant products